Bok is a surname.

Origins
As a Chinese surname, Bok transcribes the Hokkien pronunciations of various surnames spelled in Mandarin Pinyin as Mu (e.g.  'herder';  'elegant') or Mo. Hokkien spellings of Chinese surnames are often found in Malaysia and Singapore, where many descendants of Chinese migrants can trace their roots to the Fujian province of China.

The Dutch surname Bok comes from the Dutch word for billy goat, . Similarly, the Jewish surname Bok, a variant spelling of Bock, originated from the German word for billy goat, .

The character used to write this surname, Radical 25, is also used for the Chinese surname now pronounced Bǔ in Standard Mandarin.

As a Swedish surname, Bok originated as an ornamental surname, from  'beech'.

Bok is also a Slovenian surname, of unexplained origin.

Statistics
In the Netherlands, there were 1,751 people with the surname Bok and five with the surname Bók as of 2007, up from 1,197 in 1947.

The 2000 South Korean Census found 8,644 people in 2,663 households with the surname Bok; 7,471 of those were members of the Myeoncheon Bok clan.

The 2010 United States Census found 738 people with the surname Bok, making it the 31,383rd-most-common name in the country. This represented an increase from 599 (35,522nd-most-common) in the 2000 Census. In the 2010 census, 73.71% of the bearers of the surname identified as White, and 21.41% as Asian.

Notable people with the surname

Bart Bok (1906–1983), Dutch-born American astronomer
Benjamin Bok (born 1995), Dutch chess grandmaster
Chip Bok (born 1952), American cartoonist
Christian Bök (born 1966), Canadian experimental poet
Curtis Bok (1897–1962), Pennsylvania Supreme Court justice
Derek Bok (born 1930), American lawyer and president of Harvard University
Edward Bok (1863–1930), Dutch-born American publisher, author, and editor of Ladies' Home Journal
Erika Bók, Hungarian actress
Francis Bok (born 1979), Dinka tribesman and abolitionist
Bok Geo-il (born 1946), South Korean novelist
Gideon Bok (born 1966), American painter
Gordon Bok (born 1939), American folklorist and singer-songwriter
Hannes Bok (1914–1964), pen name of American illustrator Wayne Woodard
Henri Bok (born 1950), Dutch bass clarinetist
Hilary Bok (born 1959), American author and professor of philosophy
Kenzie Bok (born 1989), American local politician in Boston
Marike Bok (1943–2017), Dutch portrait painter
Martijn Bok (born 1973), Dutch tennis player
Miloš Bok (born 1968), Czech composer
Priscilla Fairfield Bok (1896–1975), American astronomer 
Richard Bok (born 1969), Singaporean soccer coach
Sissela Bok (born 1934), Swedish-born American philosopher and ethicist
Willem Eduard Bok (1846–1904), Dutch-born South African Boer politician
Willem Eduard Bok Jr. (1880–1956), South African lawyer, son of the above

See also
Bok (disambiguation)

References

Dutch-language surnames
Hokkien-language surnames
Korean-language surnames
Swedish-language surnames